Billion Dollar Gravy is the second studio album by drum n bass act London Elektricity, released in 2003. The album is known for its usage of live musicians, such as the Jungle Drummer (drums), Liane Carroll (jazz vocals), Andy Waterworth (upright bass), Robert Owens (vocals), and others, much like London Elektricity's debut, Pull the Plug.

Track listing
"Billion Dollar Gravy" – 6:23
"Different Drum" – 7:23
"Fast Soul Music" – 6:22
"To Be Me" – 6:16
"The Great Drum + Bass Swindle" – 7:09
"Cum Dancing" – 7:15
"Main Ingredient" – 4:35
"Harlesden" – 5:44
"My Dreams" – 7:24
"Born to Synthesise" – 6:42
"Syncopated City" – 5:57

References

External links
Billion Dollar Gravy Review on trancecritic.com (archived 17 July 2011)
Review of Billion Dollar Gravy at Lunar Magazine

2003 albums
Hospital Records albums
London Elektricity albums